The styloglossus muscle is a bilaterally paired muscle of the tongue. It originates at the styloid process of the temporal bone. It inserts onto the side of the tongue. It acts to elevate and retract the tongue. It is innervated by the hypoglossal nerve (cranial nerve XII).

Anatomy 
The styloglossus muscle is the shortest and smallest of the three styloid muscles.

Origin 
It arises from (the anterior and lateral surfaces of) the styloid process of the temporal bone near its apex, and from the stylomandibular ligament.

Course and relations 
It passes anterioinferiorly from its origin to its insertion between the internal carotid artery and the external carotid artery, and between the superior pharyngeal constrictor muscle and the middle pharyngeal constrictor muscle.

Insertion 
It divides upon the side of the tongue near the dorsal surface of the tongue, blending with the fibers of the longitudinalis inferior muscle anterior to the hyoglossus muscle.

Innervation 
The styloglossus is innervated by the hypoglossal nerve (CN XII) (like all muscles of the tongue except palatoglossus which is innervated by the pharyngeal plexus of vagus nerve (CN X)).

Function
The styloglossus draws up the sides of the tongue to create a trough for swallowing. Acting bilaterally (both styloglossus muscles contracting simultaneously) they also aid in retracting the tongue.

Additional images

References

External links
 

Muscles of the head and neck
Tongue